William James Crowe Jr. (January 2, 1925 – October 18, 2007) was a United States Navy admiral and diplomat who served as the 11th chairman of the Joint Chiefs of Staff under Presidents Ronald Reagan and George H. W. Bush, and as the ambassador to the United Kingdom and Chair of the Intelligence Oversight Board under President Bill Clinton.

Early life and education
Crowe was born in La Grange, Kentucky on January 2, 1925. At the beginning of the Great Depression, Crowe's father moved the family to Oklahoma City. In June 1946, Crowe completed a war-accelerated course of study and graduated with the Class of 1947 from the United States Naval Academy in Annapolis, Maryland.

Career
From 1954 to 1955, Crowe served as assistant to the naval aide of President Dwight D. Eisenhower. From 1956 to 1958, Crowe served as executive officer of the submarine  (SS-565). 

In 1958, he served as an aide to the Deputy Chief of Naval Operations. From there, Crowe earned a master's degree in education at the Stanford Graduate School of Education. After turning down an invitation from Admiral Hyman G. Rickover to enter the Navy's nuclear power program, 

Crowe earned a Ph.D. in politics from Princeton University in 1965 after completing a doctoral dissertation titled "The policy roots of the modern Royal Navy 1946-1963." 

During the Vietnam War he was the senior adviser to the Vietnamese Riverine Force. In 1969, he took command of Submarine Division 31, homeported in San Diego, California.

A long string of assignments followed:
1967 – Head of East Asia Pacific Branch, Politico-Military Division, Office of the Chief of Naval Operations
1970 – Senior adviser to the Vietnamese Navy Riverine Force
1973 – promoted to rear admiral and named Deputy Director, Strategic Plans, Policy, Nuclear Systems, and NSC Affairs Division, Office of the Chief of Naval Operations
1975 – Director, East Asia and Pacific Region, Office of the Secretary of Defense
1976 – Commander, Middle East Force (COMMIDEASTFOR)
1977 – promoted to vice admiral and named Deputy Chief of Naval Operations, Plans, Policy and Operations
1980 – promoted to admiral and named Commander-in-Chief, Allied Forces Southern Europe (CINCSOUTH)
1983 – as CINCSOUTH, named Commander-in-Chief, United States Naval Forces Europe (CINCUSNAVEUR)
1983 – Commander-in-Chief, United States Pacific Command (CINCPAC)

On July 10, 1985, Crowe was appointed by President Ronald Reagan to serve as Chairman of the Joint Chiefs of Staff (CJCS). He continued to serve as CJCS through the Bush administration until 1989, when he retired from active duty. He was the first Chairman of the Joint Chiefs of Staff to serve under the provisions of the Goldwater-Nichols Department of Defense Reorganization Act of 1986, where he as chairman became (not the collegial body of the Joint Chiefs of Staff), by statute, the principal military adviser to the president, the National Security Council, and the Secretary of Defense. In 1989, Army General Colin L. Powell succeeded him as CJCS.

Later life and death
After he retired in October 1989, Crowe returned to the University of Oklahoma and William J. Crowe chair in geopolitics. Crowe surprised politicians when he endorsed Bill Clinton in the presidential election of 1992. President Clinton named Crowe chairman of the President's Foreign Intelligence Advisory Board in 1993. In 1994, Clinton appointed Crowe the United States Ambassador to the United Kingdom, and he served in that capacity until 1997.

Crowe sat on the boards of Texaco, Merrill Lynch, Pfizer, Norfolk Southern Corporation, and General Dynamics. He also served on the board of Emergent BioSolutions (then Bioport), a company that provided controversial anthrax vaccinations to the U.S. military in the 1990s. The deal was approved by the Clinton administration, with which Crowe had a previous relationship. At the time of his death, Crowe served as the chairman of the board of Global Options, Inc., an international risk-management and business solutions company headquartered in Washington, D.C.

As he did at the University of Oklahoma in 1990–91, Crowe taught a seminar class on national security at the United States Naval Academy from 2000 to 2007.

In 2004, Crowe was among 27 retired diplomats and military commanders called Diplomats and Military Commanders for Change who publicly said the administration of President George W. Bush did not understand the world and was unable to handle "in either style or substance" the responsibilities of global leadership. 

On June 16, 2004 the former senior diplomats and military commanders issued a statement against the Iraq War.

Death
Crowe died on October 18, 2007, at Bethesda Naval Hospital in Maryland at age 82 due to a heart condition. 

His funeral was held on October 31, 2007, at the Naval Academy chapel; Bill Clinton spoke. Crowe was buried later that day in the United States Naval Academy Cemetery. 

As of 2016, he is one of only two deceased former Chairman of the Joint Chiefs to not be buried at Arlington National Cemetery. His predecessor, John William Vessey Jr. died in 2016 and was buried in Minnesota State Veterans Cemetery, Little Falls, Minnesota.

Legacy
In 2008, a fellowship was established in Crowe's honor at the University of Kentucky's Patterson School of Diplomacy and International Commerce to support a former member of the U.S. armed forces who – like Crowe – is shifting from military to diplomatic service.

In 2009, the International Programs Center at the University of Oklahoma established the Admiral William J. Crowe Jr. Award.  This award is presented to an outstanding International and Area Studies (IAS) graduate every spring semester. The award recognizes an IAS student who has demonstrated high academic achievement, a commitment to public service, and a desire to pursue a career in global affairs.
Also in 2009, the Xbox/ PS2 game, Heroes of the Pacific, was released. The main character's name is also William Crowe, though whether or not this was inspired by the real-life Crowe is unknown.

Personal life
Crowe married to Shirley Grennell in 1954. They had three children.

Dates of rank
 Apprentice Seaman, United States Naval Reserve: December 4, 1942
 Midshipman, United States Naval Academy: June 23, 1943

At the time of Admiral Crowe's promotion, all rear admirals wore two stars, but the rank was divided into an "upper" and "lower half" for pay purposes

Awards and recognition
Crowe was awarded Doctor of Laws (LL.D.) honorary degrees from numerous universities, including University of Liverpool, The George Washington University, and Knox College.

In 1986, he received the Golden Plate Award of the American Academy of Achievement presented by Awards Council member and Supreme Allied Commander Europe, General Bernard W. Rogers, USA.

In 1989, Crowe appeared in an episode of the television sitcom Cheers (Season 7, Episode 17 "Hot Rocks"), where he played himself, and was accused of stealing the General Managers (Kirstie Alley) diamond earrings.

On 1990, he was the first recipient of the Distinguished Sea Service Award of Naval Order of the United States.

In 1993, Crowe published his memoirs in the book The Line of Fire: From Washington to the Gulf, the Politics and Battles of the New Military.

Crowe received four Defense Distinguished Service Medals and numerous military decorations from heads of state. In 1998, the American Atatürk Association honored Crowe with the "Atatürk Peace and Democracy Award". Following his retirement from the Navy, he was awarded a 2000 Presidential Medal of Freedom, the United States' highest civilian honor.

Awards and decorations
Badges
 Submarine Warfare Insignia
 Office of the Joint Chiefs of Staff Identification Badge

References

External links

 Foreword by Adm. (ret.) William J. Crowe.

|-

|-

|-

|-

1925 births
2007 deaths
Ambassadors of the United States to the United Kingdom
United States Navy personnel of the Vietnam War
Burials at the United States Naval Academy Cemetery
Chairmen of the Joint Chiefs of Staff
Classen School of Advanced Studies alumni
Joint Chiefs of Staff
Military aides to the President of the United States
Military personnel from Kentucky
Order of National Security Merit members
People from La Grange, Kentucky
Presidential Medal of Freedom recipients
Recipients of the Air Medal
Recipients of the Defense Distinguished Service Medal
Recipients of the Gallantry Cross (Vietnam)
Recipients of the Legion of Merit
Recipients of the Navy Distinguished Service Medal
Stanford Graduate School of Education alumni
United States Naval Academy alumni
United States Navy admirals
Recipients of the Distinguished Service Order (Vietnam)
Recipients of the Humanitarian Service Medal
20th-century American diplomats